Rimforsa is a locality situated in Kinda Municipality, Östergötland County, Sweden with 2,238 inhabitants in 2010.

It is surrounded by a lot of forest and is approximately 40 km south of the city of Linköping.

References

External links 
 The Kinda Municipality sites (in Swedish language)
 The Eastern Swedish Tourist Board tourist information agency (in English language)
 The Kinda Municipality Tourist Board tourist information agency (in English language)

Kinda Municipality
Populated places in Östergötland County
Populated places in Kinda Municipality